The swinging-flashlight test, also known as the swinging light test, is used in medical examinations to identify a relative afferent pupillary defect.

Process
For an adequate test, vision must not be entirely lost. In dim room light, the examiner notes the size of the pupils. The patient is asked to gaze into the distance, and the examiner swings the beam of a penlight back and forth from one pupil to the other, and observes the size of pupils and reaction in the eye that is lit.

Interpretation
 Normally, each illuminated pupil promptly becomes constricted. The opposite pupil also constricts consensually.
 When ocular disease, such as cataract, impairs vision, the pupils respond normally.
 When the optic nerve is damaged, the sensory (afferent) stimulus sent to the midbrain is reduced. The pupil, responding less vigorously, dilates from its prior constricted state when the light is moved away from the unaffected eye and towards the affected eye. This response is a relative afferent pupillary defect (or Marcus Gunn pupil).

See also
 Eye examination

References 

 Bickley L.S. 2008. Bates' guide to physical examination and history taking. 10th ed. Lippincott Williams and Wilkins, New York. p. 244.

Diagnostic ophthalmology
Medical signs